Brachychira ferruginea is a moth in the family Notodontidae first described by Per Olof Christopher Aurivillius in 1905.

Distribution
It is found in Angola, Cameroon, and Nigeria.

References
Aurivillius, C. (1905). "Lieutnant A. Schultze's Sammlung von Lepidopteren aus West-Afrika". Arkiv för Zoologi. 2 (12): 1–47, pls. 1–5.

Moths described in 1905
Notodontidae